Lonicera nigra, known in English as black-berried honeysuckle is a bush honeysuckle native to the mountains of central and southern Europe.

References

External links

nigra
Taxa named by Carl Linnaeus